DMMDA-2 is a psychedelic phenethylamine discussed by Alexander Shulgin in his book PiHKAL (Phenethylamines i Have Known And Loved); however, he was not the first to synthesize it. Shulgin comments in his book that a 50 milligram dose of DMMDA-2 produces similar effects to MDA. DMMDA-2 can be synthesized from dillapiole.

References

Further reading
 
 

Entactogens and empathogens
Substituted amphetamines
Benzodioxoles
Hydroxyquinol ethers
Mescalines
2,5-Dimethoxyphenethylamines